Sayo may refer to:

Sayo (given name), a feminine Japanese given name
Sayō, Hyōgo, a town in Sayō District, Hyōgo Prefecture, Japan
Sayō District, Hyōgo, a district in Hyōgo Prefecture, Japan
Sayo Station, a railway station in Hyōgo Prefecture, Japan
Sayo (woreda), a woreda in the Oromia Region of Ethiopia

See also
Siege of Saïo, a battle of the East African Campaign of World War II